The list of shipwrecks in 1948 includes ships sunk, foundered, grounded, or otherwise lost during 1948.

January

2 January

3 January

6 January

7 January

9 January

11 January

12 January

16 January

19 January

21 January

30 January

31 January

February

3 February

6 February

10 February

12 February

16 February

18 February

23 February

24 February

27 February

29 February

Unknown date

March

8 March

9 March

10 March

14 March

22 March

25 March

31 March

April

3 April

4 April

8 April

10 April

11 April

18 April

19 April

24 April

Unknown April

May

6 May

8 May

11 May

12 May

14 May

16 May

25 May

31 May

June

9 June

11 June

16 June

24 June

Unknown date

July

2 July

4 July

5 July

8 July

17 July

18 July

20 July

21 July

24 July

25 July

27 July

28 July

29 July

31 July

Unknown date

August

1 August

3 August

4 August

11 August

17 August

19 August

22 August

25 August

29 August

30 August

Unknown date

September

5 September

6 September

11 September

13 September

16 September

19 September

20 September

21 September

24 September

27 September

28 September

October

2 October

5 October

6 October

15 October

16 October

17 October

22 October

25 October

26 October

30 October

31 October

November

1 November

5 November

8 November

10 November

11 November

13 November

14 November

17 November

22 November

23 November

30 November

December

4 December

15 December

18 December

20 December

24 December

28 December

30 December

Unknown date

References

See also 

 Lists of shipwrecks

1948
 
Ships